Richard H. Immerman (born April 28, 1949) is an American historian and author. He is currently Marvin Wachman Director Emeritus at the Center for the Study of Force and Diplomacy at Temple University, which he co-founded in 1993 with Russell Weigley, and David Rosenberg. Prior to his chair at Temple University, Immerman served as Assistant Deputy Director of National Intelligence for Analytic Integrity and Standards from 2007 to 2009.  Immerman was the 40th president of the Society for Historians of American Foreign Relations.

Publications 
 “Life is what happens to you when you’re busy making other plans” Essay Series on Learning the Scholar’s Craft: Reflections of Historians and International Relations Scholars 23 April 2020
 
 
 
 ; 2012: 
 
 
  Endnotes

References

21st-century American historians
21st-century American male writers
American male non-fiction writers
1949 births
Living people
Cornell University alumni
Temple University faculty
Boston College alumni